The Chef Menteur Pass is a narrow natural waterway which, along with the Rigolets, connects Lake Pontchartrain and Lake Borgne in New Orleans, Louisiana. In the days of sailing ships, much commerce from the Gulf of Mexico sailed through the pass and the Rigolets into Lake Pontchartrain to New Orleans and surrounding communities. The Lake Catherine neighborhood of New Orleans is to the east side of the pass. The Venetian Isles neighborhood of New Orleans is to the west of the pass.

Chef Menteur Pass was long guarded by Fort Macomb, now an abandoned ruin on the western side of the pass. Two bridges span the pass. The automobile bridge, constructed in 1929, carries U.S. Highway 90; the portion of this road between central New Orleans and the pass was long known as "Chef Menteur Road" before the route became a U.S. highway. Portions are still known as "Chef Menteur Highway." The CSX railroad bridge also spans Chef Menteur Pass a short distance south of the highway bridge.

This area was hit hard by Hurricane Katrina in 2005. The Highway 90 bridge was the only bridge open from the day that the hurricane struck on 29 August 2005 and remained open for sometime after the hurricane to aid residents of Slidell access to New Orleans and to aid in access to I-10 East, I-12 West and I-59 North. Repairs to the bridge were completed in August 2006.

See also

Bodies of water of Louisiana
Landforms of Orleans Parish, Louisiana
Straits of the United States
Straits of the Caribbean